Church of the Intercession of the Holy Virgin ― one of the oldest churches in Rostov-on-Don (there is a common misconception that it was the first church in the city). The original building was situated approximately at the corner of Bolshaya Sadovaya street. Over time, it has somewhat shifted towards Bogatyanovsky Lane (now ― Kirov Avenue).

History 
In 1762, after the demolition of St. Anne fortress, located near Cherkassk (nowadays ― Starocherkasskaya village) on Vasilyevsky hills, it was decided to transport the Holy Protection Church located therein to the newly built St. Dimitry of Rostov fortress. The church was dismantled, all logs were numbered and transported to the chosen place. All of the priests and most of the parishioners were soldiers. The exact location of the first church building ― the northeast pit of Kirov public garden, was discovered in 2003, during the course of archaeological studies.

Over time, there had been grown a need for a bigger church. In 1781 the chief commandant Major General Simon Guryev sent a petition to Archbishop Nikiforov, head of the Slovenian and Kherson diocese, "for permission to organize a new and bigger church, to replace the dilapidated one." In 1782, the permission was granted. The old church building was dismantled and almost at the same place a new building (also wooden) was constructed. The consecration of the church took place on September 28, 1784.

In 1796, right southern aisle was attached to the Intercession Church. In its construction were used materials of the dismantled Church of St. Dimitry of Rostov. The aisle was also devoted to St. Dimitry.

In 1818 in bell tower were installed clocks.

For a considerable period of time Intercession Church served as the principal church not only for the fortress of St. Dimitry of Rostov, but also for people of local settlements. Since the end of the 18th century Church of Intercession had been considered to be a cathedral. The status changed in 1822, when Church of the Nativity of the Blessed Virgin Mary on the decree of the Holy Synod was declared cathedral.

On November 2, 1895 due to the negligence of the caretaker there was a fire, which has burned down the bell tower and damaged the building of the church itself.

On August 10, 1897 a new stone building was constructed on the project of architect Nikolay Sokolov. The new building was located just west of the old one ― closer to Bogatyanovsky Lane (now ― Kirov Avenue). Construction was completed in 1909 and on May 9, Old Style (May 22, New Style) the new church, named New-Intercession (Ново-Покровская), was consecrated.

However, the old damaged church had still stood for quite a long time and was demolished only in 1917.

Description of the church built in 1909  

The building was constructed in Russian Revival style and had a width of 34 metres, 53 metres in length and also 53 metres in height (together with the cross). The height of the bell tower was 74,5 meters, with the main bell weighing 5100 kg.

The church constituted a three-altar temple, including the main ― Basil altar and two chapels: the right one was consecrated in the name of St. Dimitry of Rostov and the left one ― in the name of the St. George. All marble works were done by Italian artist E.R. Mintseoni. The arches, domes, and temple walls were painted by artists I. Lavrov and I. Smirnov. The church originally had electric lighting.

In 1930 the church was demolished. In the following years a fountain was constructed on its place. Later there was also established a public garden and constructed a Monument to Sergey Kirov (it is said that for construction of this monument there were used marble slabs left from the church)

Restoration of the church 
In the post-soviet times, there were talks about the restoration of the church. On 3 February 2005, at the Kirov public garden was installed and consecrated a memorial cross and was laid the first symbolic stone in the foundation of the new church. Construction of the temple was funded by donations from all over Russia. The church, built on the project of architect G. Shevchenko, received the name of Old-Intercession (Старо-Покровская) and was consecrated on November 11, 2007 by the Archbishop of Rostov and Novocherkassk Panteleimon.

External links 
 Virtual Tour, Rostov-on-Don
 ХРАМЫ РОСТОВА-НА-ДОНУ. ХРИСТИАНСКИЕ ИМЕНА НА КАРТЕ ГОРОДА
 Покровский храм
 Покровский храм Ростова

Churches in Rostov-on-Don
Churches completed in 2007